Otto Greiner (16 December 1869 – 24 September 1916) was a German painter and graphic artist.

He was born in Leipzig and began his career there as a lithographer and engraver. He relocated to Munich around 1888 and studied there under Alexander Liezen-Mayer. Greiner's mature style – characterized by unexpected spatial juxtapositions and a sharply focused, photographic naturalism – was strongly influenced by the work of Max Klinger, whom he met in 1891 while visiting Rome.

Greiner died in Munich in 1916. The largest collection of his work in the United States is held by the Jack Daulton Collection in Los Altos Hills, California.

See also
 List of German painters

References

Further reading 
 Prof. Dr. Hans W. Singer: Otto Greiner – Meister der Zeichnung. A. Schumann's Verlag, Leipzig 1912.
 
 Julius Vogel: Otto Greiner. Velhagen & Klasings, Bielefeld 1925
 Rolf Günther: Der Symbolismus in Sachsen 1870–1920. Dresden, Sandstein, 2005,

External links 
 
 Collection of Works by Otto Greiner
 Entry for Otto Greiner on the Union List of Artist Names
 

19th-century German painters
19th-century German male artists
German male painters
German Symbolist painters
German erotic artists
20th-century German painters
20th-century German male artists
1869 births
1916 deaths
Artists from Leipzig